Bon Accord Dam is an earth-fill type dam located on the Apies River, some 15 km north of Pretoria.  The dam comprises an earth embankment with a side spillway.  The catchment area of the dam is 315 km2 and comprises primarily the City of Tshwane Metropolitan Municipal area in Gauteng, South Africa. It was established in 1923 and its main purpose is irrigation.

See also

List of reservoirs and dams in South Africa
List of rivers of South Africa

References 

 List of South African Dams from the Department of Water Affairs and Forestry (South Africa)

Dams in South Africa
Crocodile River (Limpopo)
Dams completed in 1925